Senator Smith may refer to:

Fictional characters
Jefferson Smith, a character in the 1939 comedy-drama film Mr. Smith Goes to Washington
Senator Smith, a character in the 1941 western film They Died with Their Boots On
Lafe Smith, a character in the 1962 drama film Advise & Consent
Senator Smith, a character in the 2003 television show Mister Sterling

Members of the Australian Senate
David Smith (Australian Capital Territory politician) (born 1970), Australian Senator from the Australian Capital Territory from 2018 to 2019
Dean Smith (Australian politician) (born 1969), Australian Senator from Western Australia since 2012
Marielle Smith (born 1986), Australian Senator from South Australia since 2019
Staniforth Smith (1869–1934), Australian Senator from Western Australia from 1901 to 1906

Members of the Canadian Senate
Benjamin Franklin Smith (1865–1944), Canadian Senator from New Brunswick from 1935 to 1944
David Smith (Canadian senator) (1941–2020), Canadian Senator from Cobourg, Ontario from 2002 to 2016
Donald Smith (politician) (1905–1985), Canadian Senator from Queens—Shelburne from 1955 to 1980
E. D. Smith (1853–1948), Canadian Senator from Wentworth, Ontario from 1913 to 1946
Frank Smith (Canadian politician) (1822–1901), Canadian Senator from Toronto, Ontario from 1871 to 1900
George Isaac Smith (1909–1982), Canadian Senator from Colchester, Nova Scotia from 1975 to 1982
Larry Smith (Canadian politician) (born 1951), Canadian Senator from Saurel, Quebec since 2011
Sydney John Smith (1892–1976), Canadian Senator from British Columbia from 1957 to 1968

Members of the Irish Senate
Matthew Smith (Irish politician) (died 1955), Irish Senator from 1954 to 1955
Michael Smith (Irish politician) (born 1940), Irish Senator in 1982 and from 1983 to 1987

Members of the Liberian Senate
James Skivring Smith (1825–1892), Liberian Senator from 1855 to 1863 and from 1868 to 1869

Members of the United States Senate
Benjamin A. Smith II (1916–1991), U.S. Senator from Massachusetts from 1960 to 1962
Bob Smith (New Hampshire politician) (born 1941), U.S. Senator from New Hampshire from 1990 to 2003
Daniel Smith (surveyor) (1748–1818), U.S. Senator from Tennessee from 1798 to 1799 and from 1805 to 1809
Delazon Smith (1816–1860), U.S. Senator from Oregon in 1859
Ellison D. Smith (1864–1944), U.S. Senator from South Carolina from 1909 to 1944
Gordon H. Smith (born 1952), U.S. Senator from Oregon from 1997 to 2009
Howard Alexander Smith (1880–1966), U.S. Senator from New Jersey from 1944 to 1959
Israel Smith (1759–1810), U.S. Senator from Vermont from 1803 to 1807
James Smith Jr. (1851–1927), U.S. Senator from New Jersey from 1893 to 1899
John Smith (New York politician, born 1752) (1752–1816), U.S. Senator from New York from 1804 to 1813
John Smith (Ohio politician, died 1824) (1735–1824), U.S. Senator from Ohio from 1803 to 1808
John Walter Smith (1845–1925), U.S. Senator from Maryland from 1908 to 1921
M. Hoke Smith (1855–1931), U.S. Senator from Georgia from 1911 to 1921
Marcus A. Smith (1851–1924), U.S. Senator from Arizona from 1912 to 1921
Margaret Chase Smith (1897–1995), U.S. Senator from Maine from 1949  to 1973
Nathan Smith (senator) (1770–1835), U.S. Senator from Connecticut from 1833 to 1835
Oliver H. Smith (1794–1859), U.S. Senator from Indiana from 1837 to 1843
Perry Smith (politician) (1783–1852), U.S. Senator from Connecticut from 1837 to 1843
Ralph Tyler Smith (1915–1972), U.S. Senator from Illinois from 1969 to 1970
Samuel Smith (Maryland politician) (1752–1839), U.S. Senator from Maryland from 1803 to 1815 and from 1822 to 1833
Tina Smith (born 1958), U.S. Senator from Minnesota since 2018
Truman Smith (1791–1884), U.S. Senator from Connecticut from 1849 to 1854
William Alden Smith (1859–1932), U.S. Senator from Michigan from 1907 to 1919
William Smith (South Carolina senator) (1762–1840), U.S. Senator from South Carolina from 1816 to 1823 and from 1826 to 1831
Willis Smith (1887–1953), U.S. Senator from North Carolina from 1950 to 1953

United States state senate members

Alabama State Senate
Harri Anne Smith (born 1962)
Robert Hardy Smith (1813–1878)

Arizona State Senate
Steve Smith (Arizona politician) (fl. 2010s)
Tom Smith (Arizona politician) (born 1927)

Florida State Senate
Chris Smith (Florida politician) (born 1970)
Rod Smith (politician) (born 1949)

Georgia State Senate
James Monroe Smith (Georgia planter) (1839–1915)
Preston Smith (Georgia state politician) (fl. 2000s–2010s)
William Ephraim Smith (1829–1890)

Illinois State Senate
Edward O. Smith (1817–1892)
Elbert S. Smith (1911–1983)
Frank L. Smith (1867–1950)
Ora Smith (1884–1965)
Ralph Tyler Smith (1915–1972)
Theophilus W. Smith (1784–1846)
Thomas Vernor Smith (1890–1964)

Indiana State Senate
Alonzo G. Smith (1848–1907)
Jim Smith (Indiana politician)
Marcus C. Smith (1825–1900)
Samuel Smith Jr. (fl. 1990s–2000s)
Thomas Smith (Indiana congressman) (1799–1876)

Iowa State Senate
Edward McMurray Smith (1870–1953)
Hiram Y. Smith (1843–1894)
Roby Smith (born 1969)

Kansas State Senate
Glee S. Smith Jr. (1921–2015)
Greg Smith (Kansas politician) (born 1959)

Kentucky State Senate
Brandon Smith (politician) (born 1967)
David Highbaugh Smith (1854–1928)
John Speed Smith (1792–1854)

Maine State Senate
Clyde H. Smith (1876–1940)
Douglas Smith (Maine politician) (born 1946)
Francis Ormand Jonathan Smith (1806–1876)

Maryland State Senate
Robert Smith (Cabinet member) (1757–1842)
Thomas Alexander Smith (1850–1932)
William C. Smith Jr. (born 1982)
William Smith (Maryland politician) (1728–1814)

Massachusetts State Senate
George Edwin Smith (1849–1919)
Josiah Smith (1738–1803)

Michigan State Senate
George A. Smith (Michigan politician) (1825–1893)
John W. Smith (Detroit mayor) (1882–1942)
Nick Smith (American politician) (born 1934)
Samuel William Smith (1852–1931)
Virgil C. Smith (born 1947)
Virgil Smith Jr. (born 1979)

Mississippi State Senate
Frank Ellis Smith (1918–1997)
Martin T. Smith (1934–2015), Mississippi State Senate

Missouri State Senate
Francis Smith (Missouri politician) (1905–1984)
Jeff Smith (Missouri politician) (born 1973)
Madison Roswell Smith (1850–1919)
Randle Jasper Smith (1908–1962)

Nebraska State Senate
Adrian Smith (politician) (born 1970)
Alva Smith (1850–1924)
Jim Smith (Nebraska politician) (born 1959)

New Jersey State Senate
Bob Smith (New Jersey state senator) (born 1947)
Bradford S. Smith (born 1950)
Hezekiah Bradley Smith (1816–1887)
L. Harvey Smith (born 1948)
Walter L. Smith Jr. (1917–1994)

New York State Senate
Ada L. Smith (born 1945)
Bernard C. Smith (1923–1999)
Jesse C. Smith (1808–1888)
John E. Smith (New York politician) (1843–1907)
John Smith (New York politician, born 1752) (1752–1816)
Joshua B. Smith (1801–1860)
Joshua Smith (New York politician) (1763–1845)
Justin A. Smith (1818–1879)
Malcolm Smith (American politician) (born 1956)
Sanford W. Smith (1869–1929)
Saxton Smith (1802–1890)
William T. Smith (1916–2010)
William Smith (New York state senator) (1720–1799)

North Carolina State Senate
Benjamin Smith (North Carolina politician) (1756–1826)
Erica D. Smith (born 1969)
Fred Smith (North Carolina politician) (born 1942)
McNeill Smith (1918–2011)
William Alexander Smith (politician) (1828–1888)
William Nathan Harrell Smith (1812–1889)

Ohio State Senate
John Quincy Smith (1824–1901)
Shirley Smith (politician) (born 1950)

Oregon State Senate
Elmo Smith (1909–1968)
William Smith (Oregon politician)

Pennsylvania State Senate
Abraham Herr Smith (1815–1894)
Joseph F. Smith (Pennsylvania politician) (1920–1999)
Samuel A. Smith (1795–1861)
William Rudolph Smith (1787–1868)

South Carolina State Senate
O'Brien Smith (1756–1811)
William Smith (South Carolina representative) (1751–1837)

Texas State Senate
John Lee Smith (1894–1963)
Preston Smith (governor) (1912–2003)

Vermont State Senate
Charles Manley Smith (1868–1937)
J. Gregory Smith (1818–1891)
Levi P. Smith (1885–1970)
Milford K. Smith (1906–1984)
Peter Plympton Smith (born 1945)
Worthington Curtis Smith (1823–1894)

Virginia State Senate
Alfred C. Smith (1893–)
Arthur R. Smith (1805–1865)
Benjamin H. Smith (1797–1887)
H. Selwyn Smith (1922–2013)
R. S. Blackburn Smith (1871–1928)
Ralph K. Smith (born 1942)

Washington State Senate
Adam Smith (Washington politician) (born 1965)
John Smith (Washington politician) (born 1973)
Linda Smith (American politician) (born 1950)

West Virginia Senate
Anthony Smith (politician) (1844–)
Joe L. Smith (1880–1962)
Randy Smith (politician) (born 1960)

Wisconsin State Senate
Augustus L. Smith (1833–1902)
Charles F. Smith Jr. (1918–2001)
Charles H. Smith (Wisconsin politician) (1863–1915)
Herbert H. Smith (1898–)
Horatio N. Smith (1820–1886)
John B. Smith (Wisconsin politician) (1811–1879)
Patrick Henry Smith (1827–1884)
Perry H. Smith (1828–1885)
Peter J. Smith (politician) (1867–1947)
William E. Smith (politician) (1824–1883)
William Lyman Smith (1878–1964)

Other states
Asa Smith (politician) (1829–1907), Connecticut State Senate
Darius S. Smith (1833–1913), South Dakota State Senate
Debbie Smith (Nevada politician) (1956–2016), Nevada State Senate
Edward Everett Smith (1861–1931), Minnesota State Senate
Frank Smith (Montana politician) (born 1942), Montana State Senate
Henry Smith (Rhode Island governor) (1766–1818), Rhode Island State Senate
Jedediah K. Smith (1770–1828), New Hampshire State Senate
Jerry L. Smith (1943–2015), Oklahoma State Senate
John Arthur Smith (born 1942), New Mexico State Senate
John R. Smith (politician, born 1945), Louisiana State Senate
Sylvester C. Smith (1858–1913), California State Senate

See also
Cindy Hyde-Smith (born 1959), U.S. Senator from Mississippi since 2018, and before that a member of the Mississippi State Senate
Kamina Johnson-Smith, Jamaican Senator since 2009
Alexander Smyth (1765–1830), Virginia State Senate
Michael Smyth (politician) (died 1973), Irish Senate
William James Smyth (1886–1950), Northern Irish Senate
List of people with surname Smith